That Was Then, This Is Now is a coming-of age, young adult novel by S. E. Hinton, first published in 1971. Set in the 1960s, it follows the relationship between two brothers, Mark Jennings and Bryon Douglas, who are foster brothers, but find their relationship rapidly changing and deteriorating. The book was later adapted into a 1985 film starring Emilio Estevez and Craig Sheffer.

Plot
Bryon and Mark are best friends. They have lived together with Bryon’s mother ever since Mark’s parents shot each other in a drunken brawl. The boys hang out at Charlie’s Bar and earn money by hustling pool. Charlie tells the pair that M&M, a younger Hippie boy, is looking for them. Bryon and Mark find M&M in time to stop Curly Shepard and his Greaser gang from beating M&M up. The “Hippies” are a new group and the lines between the two former groups, the “Greasers” and “Socs,” are becoming blurred.

The following day, Bryon and Mark visit Bryon’s mother in the hospital. While there, Bryon meets Cathy Carlson, M&M’s older sister, who works in the snack bar. Bryon is taken with Cathy and hopes to see her again. Bryon and Mark also visit Mike Chambers, a boy Bryon’s mother befriends. Mike is recovering from a beating after being falsely accused of harming a young African American girl. Mike tells Bryon and Mark what happened, how he actually saved the girl from being harassed by a group of whites. Mike drove the girl home and his car was surrounded by a group of African American kids. They pulled him from the car and nearly beat him to death when the girl lied, claiming Mike hurt her. Despite this, Mike does not hate African Americans. When he thinks about it from the girl’s viewpoint, he can almost understand why she lied. After the visit ends, Bryon and Mark discuss Mike’s misfortune. Mark does not share Mike’s understanding of the factors that caused the girl to lie. Mark states that if anyone ever hurt him like that, he would hate them forever.

Mrs. Douglas’s hospital stay causes financial stress. The boys are forced to look for jobs, but they do not have much luck. Bryon asks Charlie for a job. Charlie refuses because Bryon is underage. Charlie also doubts Bryon’s honesty in certain areas, though he does trust Bryon enough to loan him his car so Bryon can take Cathy to a school dance.

At the dance, Bryon’s former girlfriend, Angela Shepard, starts off a fight intending to punish Ponyboy Curtis for failing to respond to her advances. Unfortunately, Mark is the unintended recipient of a bottle to the head. Bryon leaves Cathy at the dance and goes with Mark to the hospital. Mark gets stitched up. Ponyboy hot wires Charlie’s car and brings Cathy to the hospital. Bryon takes over driving duty, dropping off Ponyboy and Cathy and finally taking Mark home. The boys stay up talking. Mark tells Bryon that even though they are not blood relations, he feels like they are “real” brothers.

After Mark recovers, the boys go to Charlie’s Bar to make some money hustling pool. Bryon manages to hustle a couple of Texans, who are not happy to lose their money. The Texans wait for the boys outside, intent on teaching them a lesson. Charlie realizes the boys are in trouble and attempts to save them. The boys witness Charlie’s death when the Texans shoot him.

In the weeks that follow, the boys struggle to make sense of Charlie’s death. Meanwhile, the financial strife at home grows worse. Mrs. Douglas is hospitalized again. Mark gives Mrs. Douglas money but will not reveal where it is coming from. Mark grows distant. Bryon finds himself frequently turning to Cathy for support instead. 

One night, Bryon and Mark pick up a drunk Angela Shepard, now married, who reminisces with them. When she passes out, Mark cuts off all of her long hair. Mark reveals to a drunk Bryon that he knows where M&M is. 

Mark takes Bryon to a hippie house where M&M supposedly is, but do not find him that day. That night, while waiting outside a friend’s house, Bryon is found by the Shepards, and is beaten up very badly by them. Mark stays with the injured Bryon, and desires revenge—however, Bryon realizes that, just like Mike, he does not hate his attackers. As he gets better, Bryon visits Charlie’s grave, and feels slightly better about everything.

Bryon, Mark, Cathy, and M&M drive to The Ribbon, a two-mile long strip of entertainment businesses, and M&M says he is not going home, after getting out of the car. He goes missing for several days; Bryon and Cathy attempt to search for him, but to no avail. They finally find M&M in a hippie house, where he has overdosed on LSD. He is out-of-his-mind terrified and sick. Bryon and Cathy take M&M to hospital, where he recovers and Mr. Carlson meets up with them.

Bryon finds out Mark has been selling drugs to earn money. Bryon calls the police and tells them about Mark. Mark is arrested and given 5 years in prison. When Bryon visits Mark in prison, he finds out Mark is no longer the same person he was, and Mark now hates him. In the end, Mark cuts Bryon off mid-sentence, saying "That was then. This is now."

Bryon realizes that he has become a mixture of all his experiences and the experiences of people around him, and is much more confused now, as an adult, than when he was a child.

Connections to other books by S.E. Hinton 
The book, like Rumble Fish, takes place in Tulsa, Oklahoma, Hinton's hometown and the setting of her first book, The Outsiders. However unlike Rumble Fish, Ponyboy Curtis, the main character in The Outsiders, appears in That Was Then, This Is Now and even takes part in the events surrounding the dance.

The characters of Tim and Curly Shepard from The Outsiders  also appear, as does their sister Angela, who is original to That Was Then, This Is Now. Randy, who was in The Outsiders, also appears as a Hippie in this book, which is appropriate to those who have read or seen The Outsiders, as Randy is an affluent kid who feels guilty about the class division and becomes repulsed by it. In Tex, Mark and Cathy appear, who are original to That Was Then, This Is Now. As well Smokey, who is original to Rumble Fish, is mentioned by Mark.

Mark later appears as a hitchhiker, who has recently escaped from prison and killed multiple people.  He forces Tex and Mason to drive him to the state line, holding them at gunpoint; he is killed soon after by the police. 

Cathy appears as Tex's English teacher at school, Ms.Carlson. When Mark dies, she goes to his funeral, which makes Tex wonder why. When he asks her, Cathy says that they weren't exactly friends, but she knew him for a long time and they shared a past.

See also
 The Outsiders

References 

1971 American novels
American bildungsromans
American novels adapted into films
American young adult novels
Novels by S. E. Hinton
Novels set in Tulsa, Oklahoma
Viking Press books